Kenneth Arrow's monograph  Social Choice and Individual Values (1951, 2nd ed., 1963, 3rd ed., 2012) and a theorem within it created modern social choice theory, a rigorous melding of social ethics and voting theory with an economic flavor.  Somewhat formally, the "social choice" in the title refers to Arrow's representation of how social values from the set of individual orderings would be implemented under the constitution.  Less formally, each social choice corresponds to the feasible set of laws passed by a "vote" (the set of orderings) under the constitution even if not every individual voted in favor of all the laws.

The work culminated in what Arrow called the "General Possibility Theorem," better known thereafter as Arrow's (impossibility) theorem. The theorem states that, absent restrictions on either individual preferences or neutrality of the constitution to feasible alternatives, there exists no social choice rule that satisfies a set of plausible requirements. The result generalizes the voting paradox, which shows that majority voting may fail to yield a stable outcome.

Introduction 
The Introduction contrasts voting and markets with dictatorship and social convention (such as those in a religious code).  Both exemplify social decisions.   Voting and markets facilitate social choice in a sense, whereas dictatorship and convention limit it.  The former amalgamate possibly differing tastes to make a social choice.  The concern is with formal aspects of generalizing such choices.  In this respect it is comparable to analysis of the voting paradox from use of majority rule as a value.

Arrow asks whether other methods of taste aggregation (whether by voting or markets), using other values, remedy the problem or are satisfactory in other ways.  Here logical consistency is one check on acceptability of all the values.  To answer the  questions, Arrow proposes removing the distinction between voting and markets in favor of a more general category of collective social choice.

The analysis uses ordinal rankings of individual choice to represent  behavioral patterns.   Cardinal measures of individual  utility and, a fortiori, interpersonal comparisons of utility are avoided on grounds that such measures are unnecessary to represent behavior and depend on mutually incompatible value judgments (p. 9).

Following Abram Bergson, whose formulation of a social welfare function launched ordinalist welfare economics, Arrow avoids locating a social good as independent of individual values.  Rather, social values inhere in actions from social-decision rules (hypostatized as constitutional conditions) using individual values as input.  Then 'social values' means "nothing more than social choices" (p. 106).

Topics implicated along the way include game theory,  the compensation principle in welfare economics, extended sympathy, Leibniz's principle of the identity of indiscernibles, logrolling, and similarity of social judgments through single-peaked preferences, Kant's categorical imperative, or the decision process.

Terminology 
The book defines a few terms and logical symbols used thereafter and their applied empirical interpretation (pp. 11–19, 23).   Key among these is the "vote" ('set of orderings') of the society (more generally "collectivity") composed of  individuals (“voters” here) in the following form:  
Voters, a finite set with at least two members, indexed as i = 1, 2, ... n.
Commodities, the objects of choice (things that voters might want, goods and services), both private and public (municipal services, statecraft, etc.).
A social state is a specification (formally, an element of a vector) of a distribution among voters of commodities, labor, and resources used in their productions. 
The set of social states,  the set of all 'social states', indexed as x, y, z, . ., with at least three members.
A (weak) ordering, a ranking by a voter of all 'social states' from more to less preferred, including possible ties.
The set of 'orderings', the set of all n orderings, one ordering per voter.

The ordering of each voter ranks social states, including the distribution of commodities (possibly based on equity, by whatever metric, or any other consideration), not merely direct consumption by that voter.  So, the ordering is an "individual value," not merely, as in earlier analysis, a purely private "taste."  Arrow notes that the distinction is not sharp.  Resource allocation is specified in the production of each social state in the ordering.

The comprehensive nature of  commodities, the set of social states, and the set of orderings was noted by early reviewers.

The two properties that define any ordering of the set of objects in question (all social states here) are:

 connectedness (completeness): All the objects in the set are included in the ranking (no "undecideds" nor "abstentions") and
 transitivity:  If, for any objects x, y, and z in the set, x is ranked at least as high as y and y is ranked at least as high as z, then x is ranked at least as high as z.

 
The earlier definition of an ordering implies that any given ordering entails one of three responses on the "ballot" as between any pair of social states (x, y):  better than, as good as,  or worse than (in preference ranking).  (Here "as good as" is an "equally-ranked," not a "don't know," relation.)  

If voter i changes orderings, primes distinguish the first and second, say  compared to ' .  The same notation can apply  for two different hypothetical orderings of the same voter.

The interest of the book is in amalgamating sets of orderings. This is accomplished through a 'constitution'.  
  
A constitution (or social welfare function) is a voting rule mapping each (of at least one) set of orderings onto a social ordering, a corresponding ordering of the set of social states that applies to each voter.

A social ordering of a constitution is denoted R. (Context or a subscript distinguishes a voter ordering R from the same symbol for a social ordering.)

For any two social states x and y of a given social ordering R:

x P y is "social preference" of x over y (x is selected over y by the rule).

x I y is "social indifference" between x and y (both are ranked the same by the rule).

x R y is either "social preference" of x over y or "social indifference" between x and y (x is ranked least as good as y by the rule).

A social ordering applies to each ordering  in the set of orderings (hence the "social" part and the associated amalgamation).  This is so regardless of (dis)similarity between the social ordering and any or all the orderings in the set.  But Arrow places the constitution in the context of ordinalist welfare economics, which attempts to aggregate different tastes in a coherent, plausible way.

Arrow (pp. 15, 26–28) shows how to go from the social ordering R for a given set of orderings to a particular 'social choice' by specifying:

 the environment, S:  the subset of social states that is (hypothetically) available (feasible as to resource quantity and productivity), not merely conceivable.

The social ordering R then selects the top-ranked social state(s) from the subset as the social choice set.  
 
Less informally,  the social choice function is the function mapping each environment S of available social states (at least two) for any given set of orderings (and corresponding social ordering R) to the social choice set, the set of social states each element of which is top-ranked (by R) for that environment and that set of orderings.

The social choice function is denoted C(S).  Consider an environment that has just two social states, x and y:  C(S) = C([x, y]).  Suppose x is the only top-ranked social state.  Then C([x, y])   = {x}, the social choice set.  If x and y are instead tied, C([x, y]) = {x, y}.  Formally (p. 15), C(S) is the set of all x in S such that, for all y in S, x R y ("x is at least as good as y").

The next section invokes the following.  Let R and R'  stand for social orderings of the constitution corresponding to any 2 sets of orderings.  If R and R'  for the same environment S map to the same social choice(s), the relation of the identical social choices for R and R' is represented as: C(S) = C'(S).

Conditions and theorem 
A constitution might seem to be a promising alternative  to dictatorship and  vote-immune social convention or external control.  Arrow describes the connectedness of a social ordering as requiring only that some social choice be made from any environment of available social states.  Since some social state will prevail, this is hard to deny (especially with no place on the ballot for abstention).  The  transitivity of a social ordering has an advantage over requiring unanimity (or much less) to change between social states if there is a maladapted status quo (that is, one subject to "democratic paralysis"). Absent deadlock, transitivity crowds out any reference to the status quo as a privileged default blocking the path to a social choice (p. 120).

Arrow proposes the following "apparently reasonable" conditions to constrain the social ordering(s) of the constitution (pp. 25, 96-97).

 1.  Universal (Unrestricted) Domain U (subsequently so called):  Every logically possible set of orderings maps to its own social ordering.

Each voter is permitted by the constitution to rank the set of social states in any order, though with only one ordering per voter for a given set of orderings.

  2. Independence of Irrelevant Alternatives I: Let , ...,  and ' , ..., '  be 2 sets of orderings in the constitution. Let S be a subset of hypothetically available (not merely conceivable) social states, say x and y, from the set of social states. (Different voters could still have different rankings of the 2 social states.) Then the social orderings for the 2 respective sets of orderings select the same state(s) from the subset as the social choice.

Arrow describes this condition as an extension of ordinalism with its emphasis on prospectively observable behavior (for the subset in question).  He ascribes practical advantage to the condition from "every known electoral system" satisfying it (p. 110).

  3.  The (weak) Pareto Principle P:   For any x and y  in the set of social states, if all prefer x over y,  then x is socially selected over y.#

The conditions, particularly the second and third, may seem minimal, but jointly they are harsh, as may be represented in either of two ways.

  Arrow's Theorem [1]:  The 3 conditions of the constitution imply a dictator who prevails as to the social choice whatever that individual's preference and those of all else.

An alternate statement of the theorem adds the following condition to the above:

4.  Nondictatorship D:  No voter in the society is a dictator.  That is, there is no voter i in the society such that for every set of orderings in the domain of the constitution and every pair of distinct social states x and y, if voter i strictly prefers x over y,  x is socially selected over y.

Arrow's Theorem [2]:  The constitution is impossible, that is, the 4 conditions of a constitution imply a contradiction.

   
# Pareto is stronger than necessary in the proof of the theorem that follows above.  But it is invoked in Arrow (1963, ch. VIII) for a simpler proof than in Arrow (1951). In the latter, Arrow uses 2 other conditions, that with (2) above imply Pareto (1963, p. 97; 1987, p. 127):  
 3a. Monotonicity M (Positive Association of Individual and Social Values), as in Arrow (1987, p. 125):  For a given set of orderings with social ordering R, such that state x is socially preferred  to  state y, if the preference for x rises in some individual ordering(s) and falls in none, x is also socially preferred to y in the social ordering for the new set of orderings.
Arrow (1951, p. 26) describes social welfare here as at least not negatively related to individual preferences.  
 3b.  As defined by Arrow (1951, pp. 28–29), an Imposed Constitution is a constitution such that for some alternative social states x and y and for any set of orderings  , ...,  in the domain and corresponding social ordering R, the social ranking is x R y.
Non-imposition N  (Citizens' Sovereignty): A constitution is not to be imposed.

Under imposition, for every set of orderings in the domain, the social ranking for at least one x and y is only x R y.  The vote makes no difference to the outcome.

Proof
The proof is in two parts (Arrow, 1963, pp. 97–100).  The first part considers the hypothetical case of some one voter's  ordering that prevails ('is decisive') as to the social choice for some pair of social states no matter what that voter's preference for the pair, despite all other voters opposing.   It is shown that, for a constitution satisfying Unrestricted Domain, Pareto and Independence,  that voter's ordering would prevail for every pair of social states, no matter what the orderings of others.   So, the voter would be a Dictator. Thus, Nondictatorship requires postulating that no one would so prevail for even one pair of social states.

The second part considers more generally a set of voters that would prevail for some pair of social states, despite all other voters (if any) preferring otherwise.  Pareto  and Unrestricted Domain for a constitution imply that such a set would at least include the entire set of voters.  By Nondictatorship, the set must have at least 2 voters.  Among all such sets, postulate a set such that no other set is smaller.   Such a set can be constructed with Unrestricted Domain and an adaptation of the voting paradox to imply a still smaller set. This contradicts the postulate and so proves the theorem.

Summary, interpretation, and aftereffects 
The book proposes some apparently reasonable conditions for a "voting" rule, in particular, a 'constitution', to make consistent,  feasible social choices in a welfarist context. But then any constitution that allows dictatorship requires it, and any constitution that requires nondictatorship contradicts one of the other conditions.  Hence, the paradox of social choice.

The set of conditions across different possible votes refined welfare economics and differentiated Arrow's constitution from the pre-Arrow social welfare function.  In so doing, it also ruled out any one consistent social ordering to which an agent or official might appeal in trying to implement social welfare through the votes of others under the constitution.  The result generalizes and deepens the voting paradox to any voting rule satisfying the conditions, however complex or comprehensive.

The 1963 edition includes an additional chapter with a simpler proof of Arrow's Theorem and corrects an earlier point noted by Blau.  It also elaborates on advantages of the conditions and cites studies of Riker   and Dahl that as an empirical matter intransitivity of the voting mechanism may produce unsatisfactory inaction or majority opposition.  These support Arrow's characterization of a constitution across possible votes (that is, collective rationality) as "an important attribute of a genuinely democratic system capable of full adaptation to varying environments" (p. 120).

The theorem might seem to have unravelled a skein of behavior-based social-ethical theory from Adam Smith and Bentham on.  But Arrow himself expresses hope at the end of his Nobel prize lecture that, though the philosophical and distributive implications of the paradox of social choice were "still not clear,"  others would "take this paradox as a challenge rather than as a discouraging barrier."

The large subsequent literature has included reformulation to extend, weaken, or replace the conditions and derive implications.  In this respect Arrow's framework has been an instrument for generalizing voting theory and critically  evaluating and  broadening economic policy and social choice theory.

See also 
Arrow's impossibility theorem
Kenneth Arrow, Section 1 (the theorem and a distributional difficulty of intransitivity + majority rule)
Abram Bergson
Buchanan and Tullock, The Calculus of Consent: Logical Foundations of Constitutional Democracy
Independence of irrelevant alternatives
Pareto efficiency, strong and weak
Path dependence, contrasted in Arrow with path independence, which a social ordering assures
Political argument
Public choice theory
Social choice theory
Social welfare function
Rule according to higher law
Utilitarianism
Voting paradox
Voting system
Welfare economics
Welfarism
JEL D71 by scrolling down for Social Choice

Notes

References
Kenneth J. Arrow, 1951, 2nd ed., 1963, 3rd ed., 2012. Social Choice and Individual Values, Yale University Press.  
_, 1983. Collected Papers of Kenneth J. Arrow, v. 1, Social Choice and Justice. Description and chapter-preview links. Harvard University Press.  
_, 1987. “Arrow’s Theorem," The New Palgrave: A Dictionary of Economics, v. 1, pp. 124–26.
_, 2008. "Arrow's theorem." The New Palgrave Dictionary of Economics, 2nd Edition Abstract.
Amartya K. Sen, 1970 [1984]. Collective Choice and Social Welfare (description), ch. 1–7.1.  . .
 Michael Morreau, 2014. "Arrow's Theorem", The Stanford Encyclopedia of Philosophy (Winter  Edition), Edward N. Zalta (ed.).

External links
 Table of Contents with links to chapters.
 Link to text of Nobel prize lecture with Section 8 on the theory and background.
 Comments of Frank Hahn, Donald Saari, and Nobelists James M. Buchanan and Douglass North.
 Economic-justice high theory with Arrow's framework, context, and references in Sections 1 & 4.
 James M. Buchanan (1954). "Social Choice, Democracy, and Free Markets," Journal of Political Economy, 62(2), pp. 114-123.
 H.S. Houthakker (1952). [Review], Economic Journal, 62(246), pp. 355-58.
 I. M. D. Little (1952). "Social Choice and Individual Values," Journal of Political Economy, 60(5), pp. 422-432.

1951 non-fiction books
Mathematical economics
Social choice theory
Social ethics
Social philosophy
Works about utilitarianism
Value (ethics)
Voting theory
Rational choice theory
Books about philosophy of economics